Olší is a municipality and village in Brno-Country District in the South Moravian Region of the Czech Republic. It has about 300 inhabitants.

Administrative parts
Villages of Klokočí, Litava and Rakové are administrative parts of Olší.

References

Villages in Brno-Country District